Diane Bui Duyet, sometimes spelled "Bui-Duyet", (born 22 December 1979 in Nouméa, New Caledonia) is a French/New Caledonian swimmer. Due to the New Caledonia's status as an overseas territory of France, Bui Duyet competes for New Caledonia in regional (Pacific) competitions and for France in continental and above competitions (similar to Malia Metella's situation with French Guiana). At the 2007 and 2011 Pacific Games, Bui Duyet swam on several relay teams together with Lara Grangeon, who also represents both France and New Caledonia.

Bui Duyet was the world record holder in the women's short course (25 meter pool) 100 meter butterfly with a time of 55.05 seconds. She set the record in the semi-finals of the 2009 European Short Course Swimming Championships in Istanbul, Turkey. She went on to get a silver medal in the finals with a time of 55.93 seconds.

In April 2009, she set the French record in the long-course 50m butterfly (26.10), following up on her December 2008 setting of the European record in the short-course (25m) 100 fly (56.50). She also held the French record in the short-course 50 fly (25.56).

South Pacific Games (SPGs)
At the 2003 South Pacific Games (SPG), Bui Duyet was named the female Swimmer of the Meet, after she won 10 events, 5 in Games Records.

2007 saw her swim at her fourth South Pacific Games. Bui Duyet had a similar performance to her one from SPG'03 at SPG'07: she won all 6 events she swam and Games Records were set in 5 of them.

She was named as one of two ambassadors for the 2011 Pacific Games which New Caledonia hosted.

References

1979 births
Living people
New Caledonian female swimmers
World record setters in swimming
Mediterranean Games silver medalists for France
Swimmers at the 2009 Mediterranean Games
People from Nouméa
Mediterranean Games medalists in swimming